The Steam Railroading Institute is located at 405 South Washington Street, Owosso, Michigan. It was founded in 1969 as the Michigan State University (MSU) Railroad Club. It became the Michigan State Trust for Railway Preservation, and later adopted its present name.

The Steam Railroading Institute is an organization dedicated to the preservation, restoration, and operation of historical railroad equipment and items. It operates a heritage railroad which offers occasional passenger excursion trains using steam locomotives: ex-Pere Marquette 1225 and Chicago and North Western Railway 175.

History
The Steam Railroading Institute, dedicated to educating the public about steam-era railroad technology, is the product of the Michigan State Trust for Railway Preservation Inc. For many years, the MSTRP centered on a single steam locomotive, former Pere Marquette Railway No. 1225. After 1225's retirement, the locomotive was donated to Michigan State University. Chesapeake and Ohio Railroad Chairman Cyrus Eaton thought that the University College of Engineering ought to have a piece of real equipment to work on and convinced the MSU University Trustee Forest Akers that this was a good idea. Eaton didn't like seeing these relatively new locomotives cut up for scrap. The Dean of the College of Engineering was not convinced, so then University President John Hannah, accepted the engine as a contribution to the MSU Museum. It arrived on campus in 1957. There it sat, getting an occasional coat of paint and was opened to the public on football weekends until 1969 when a group of students took an interest in the locomotive. The Michigan State University Railroad Club was formed by student rail fans who were interested in Trains and Locomotives in general. In 1970 at the suggestion of Randy Paquette, they adopted the ambitious goal of restoring 1225 and using it to power excursion trains that would bring passengers to football games at the university. After toiling away at the locomotive for many years, the Michigan State University Railroad Club evolved as the Michigan State Trust for Railway Preservation after then MSURRC President Chuck Julian discussed the subject of how this engine would run when finished, with then University President Edgar Harden.  Harden proposed that they form a 501(c)(3) that would allow the university to give the Trust the locomotive. MSU had no interest in running a steam locomotive. The MSTRP started its corporate run in July 1979. Harden kept his promise and had the university donate the locomotive to this new organization.

In the past thirty-five years the Michigan State Trust for Railway Preservation and its Steam Railroading Institute have grown tremendously, now housing two steam locomotives, a fleet of passenger cars, and numerous pieces of rolling stock.

Situated on the site of the old Ann Arbor Railroad yard, the Steam Railroading Institute exhibits the intricacies of working steam locomotives.

Equipment

Locomotives

Former units

Rolling stock
Passenger cars:
VIA Rail coaches 5447, 5485, 5576, 5581, and 5646.
VIA Rail diner/lounge car 762.
Chesapeake & Ohio coach 1615. Owned by private individual.
Chesapeake & Ohio Pullman Sleeper "City of Ashland" 2624.
Chesapeake & Ohio/Chicago Great Western/Chicago & Northwestern Baggage/Combination Car 462, now renumbered to 4062. Occasionally used as a concession car for SRI's excursions.
PRR 8275 "Norristown Inn"/ SEMTA/ MARC 147 coach. Leased from B&O Railroad Museum in Baltimore, MD since 2005. Now owned by SRI.
US Army 89639/ Amtrak 1363/ MSTX 1363 baggage. Currently in storage.
3 ex-Amtrak/ATSF Hi-level cars; 1 step-down coach and 2 lounge cars. 

Freight cars:
Ann Arbor PS-1 Boxcar #1314
Chesapeake & Ohio/Pere Marquette Gondola #31262
Detroit & Mackinac Tank cars X-127 & X-128. Restored as Pure Oil & Dow Chemical tank car.
Detroit & Mackinac Gondola #3514
Pere Marquette Automobile car #72332
Wabash Boxcars (later Ann Arbor X4633 and X4646)
A couple flat cars.
Maintenance of Way:
Rock Island #5000-series tender/ Auxiliary Tender #5000. Former Rock Island 4-8-4 5000 series locomotive tender now used for longer excursions behind PM 1225.
Pere Marquette #361. Former Troop Sleeper. Now 1225's tool car.
Grand Trunk Western Track Foreman's/ Bunk Car #58332.
Detroit, Toledo & Ironton/ Grand Truck Burro crane #15027. A self-propelled burro crane used for light duties.
Ex. US Navy Speeder/Gasoline Motor Car.
Ann Arbor Caboose's #2838 & 2839.
Pere Marquette Caboose #A909.
Detroit & Mackinac power car #7. Former troop sleeper.

Structures
The SRI has a few new and historic structures including an original PM turntable and an old Ann Arbor Freight house.

New Buffalo Turntable
The turntable is an original  PM turntable built in 1919 to serve the Pere Marquette railyard in New Buffalo, Michigan. It operated and served a 16 stall roundhouse for many years until Chessie System took over in 1984 and ceased operations at the New Buffalo yard. The SRI acquired the turntable and had it relocated to the site. Upon purchasing, the SRI added an additional  to the turntable to better accommodate larger rolling stock like the PM 1225. Still functioning like it did during the steam era, the turntable was used by the 1225 during its service years on the PM many times despite its short length.

SRI Visitor Center
The SRI Visitor Center is located inside a renovated freight warehouse used by the Ann Arbor road. Its construction date is unclear but the foundation dates back to the 1880s. It is speculated that the original one burned down in the 1920s and the existing structure was built. Originally a creamery, the Ann Arbor used for freight storage for things like grain. Bruckman's Moving and Storage then leased the building from the railroad for storage use. The SRI purchased the building in 2004 and renovated it as their Visitor's Center containing exhibits, a model train layout, and the museum's artifact and archives collection.

References

External links
 Steam Railroading Institute history
 Pere Marquette Berkshire Type Locomotives
 Home :: Steam Railroading Institute SRI's collection page.
 Steam Locomotives
 The Argus-Press - Google News Archive Search

Heritage railroads in Michigan
Museums in Shiawassee County, Michigan
Railroad museums in Michigan